Ikenna Anthony Ikedi (born 19 September 1998) is a Nigerian footballer who plays as a midfielder for Øygarden.

Career

Club
In May 2017, Ikedi joined FK Haugesund on loan from KAA Gent.

Career statistics

Club

References

1998 births
Living people
Nigerian footballers
Association football midfielders
FK Haugesund players
Eliteserien players
Nest-Sotra Fotball players
Øygarden FK players
Norwegian First Division players
Nigerian expatriate footballers
Expatriate footballers in Belgium
Nigerian expatriate sportspeople in Belgium
Expatriate footballers in Norway
Nigerian expatriate sportspeople in Norway